Khatiguda is a census town in Nabarangapur district in the Indian state of Odisha.

Demographics
 India census, Khatiguda had a population of 6398. Males constitute 52% of the population and females 48%. Khatiguda has an average literacy rate of 70%, higher than the national average of 59.5%: male literacy is 78%, and female literacy is 61%. In Khatiguda, 12% of the population is under 6 years of age.

References

Cities and towns in Nabarangpur district